The Windsor W. Calkins House is a historic house located in Eugene, Oregon. It was listed on the National Register of Historic Places on December 9, 1981.

Description and history 
The Queen Anne style house was built in 1902 for Windsor W. Calkins, a prominent Eugene attorney and banker, and embodies the distinctive characteristics of its style, including a multitude of gables, bays, a corner tower, flare top chimneys, and variegated wood siding. It is a -story structure, rectangular in plan with four two-story projecting bays. The house is in good condition and remains virtually unaltered.

See also
 National Register of Historic Places listings in Lane County, Oregon

References

1902 establishments in Oregon
Houses completed in 1902
Houses on the National Register of Historic Places in Eugene, Oregon
Queen Anne architecture in Oregon